Ghiyāth al-Din Mansur Dashtaki (1461-1542) was an Iranian Safavid Islamic philosopher, the son of Sadr ad-Din Dashtaki. He has been called "the foremost philosopher of sixteenth-century Islam".

"His works spanned an impressive range, from theological, mystical, and Quranic studies to treatises on medicine, mathematics, astronomy, and astrology." He wrote Akhlaq-i Mansuri on ethics, a commentary on Suhrawardi's Hayākil al-nūr (Temples of Light), and glosses on Tusi's Sharh al-isharat. He also wrote a medical treatise, Ma’alem-o-Shafa.

References

1461 births
1542 deaths
16th-century Iranian philosophers
15th-century Iranian philosophers
16th-century writers of Safavid Iran